The United States District Court for the Middle District of Pennsylvania (in case citations, M.D. Pa.) is a district level federal court with jurisdiction over approximately one half of Pennsylvania. The court was created in 1901 by subdividing the United States District Court for the Eastern District of Pennsylvania and the United States District Court for the Western District of Pennsylvania. The court is under the jurisdiction of the United States Court of Appeals for the Third Circuit (except for patent claims and claims against the U.S. government under the Tucker Act, which are appealed to the Federal Circuit).

Because Harrisburg, the state capital, is located within the district's jurisdiction, most suits against the Commonwealth of Pennsylvania are filed in the Middle District. Similarly, because York County Prison served as the largest Immigration and Naturalization Service (INS) facility in the Northeast, the Middle District also adjudicated many immigration cases. The courts of appeal are now responsible for most judicial review of immigration decisions, bypassing the Middle District and other district courts.

Judge Matthew W. Brann is the Chief Judge for the Middle District of Pennsylvania; Martin John Pane is the United States Marshal for the Middle District of Pennsylvania. , the U.S. Attorney is Gerard Karam.

History 
The United States District Court for the District of Pennsylvania was one of the original 13 courts established by the Judiciary Act of 1789, on September 24, 1789.

Current judges 
:

Vacancies and pending nominations

Former judges

Chief judges

Succession of seats

Notable cases 
Kitzmiller v. Dover Area School District
Whitewood v. Wolf  This case struck down Pennsylvania's statutory ban on same-sex marriage on May 20, 2014. This was not appealed to the Third Circuit.
Lozano et al. v. City of Hazleton, M.D. Pa. No. 3:06-cv-01586-JMM (2006) (affirmed in part by the United States Court of Appeals for the Third Circuit, No. 07-3531 (September 9, 2010)).

List of U.S. Attorneys 
The people in the district are represented by the United States Attorney for the Middle District of Pennsylvania.

Samuel McCarrell (1901–1908)
Charles B. Witmer (1908–1911)
Andrew B. Dunsmore (1911–1914)
Rogers L. Burnett (1914–1921)
Andrew B. Dunsmore (1921–1934)
Frank J. McDonnell (1934–1935)
Frederick V. Follmer (1935–1946)
Arthur A. Maguire (1946–1953)
Joseph C. Kreder (1953)
Julius Levy (1953–1957)
Robert J. Hourigan (1957–1958)
Daniel Jenkins (1958–1961)
Bernard J. Brown (1961–1969)
John Cottone (1969–1979)
Carlon M. O'Malley, Jr. (1979–1982)
David Dart Queen (1982–1985)
James J. West (1985–1993)
Wayne P. Samuelson (1993)
David Barasch (1993–2001)
Martin Carlson (2001–2002)
Tom Marino (2002–2007)
Martin Carlson (2007–2009)
Dennis Pfannenschmidt (2009–2010)
Peter J. Smith (2010–2016)
Bruce D. Brandler (2016–2017)
David Freed (2017–2020)
Bruce D. Brandler (2021–2022)
Gerard Karam (2022–present)

Courthouses 
Within the Middle District, federal courthouses are located in:
 Harrisburg – Ronald Reagan Federal Building and Courthouse
 Scranton – William J. Nealon Federal Building and United States Courthouse
 Williamsport – Herman T. Schneebeli Federal Building and Courthouse
 Wilkes-Barre – Max Rosenn U.S. Courthouse

Counties of jurisdiction 
The Court's jurisdiction includes the following counties:

Adams County
Bradford County
Cameron County
Carbon County
Centre County
Clinton County
Columbia County
Cumberland County
Dauphin County
Franklin County
Fulton County
Huntingdon County
Juniata County
Lackawanna County
Lebanon County
Luzerne County
Lycoming County
Mifflin County
Monroe County
Montour County
Northumberland County
Perry County
Pike County
Potter County
Schuylkill County
Snyder County
Sullivan County
Susquehanna County
Tioga County
Union County
Wayne County
Wyoming County
York County

See also 
 Courts of Pennsylvania
 List of current United States district judges
 List of United States federal courthouses in Pennsylvania

References

External links 
 

1901 establishments in Pennsylvania
Pennsylvania, Middle District
Pennsylvania law
Government of Harrisburg, Pennsylvania
Scranton, Pennsylvania
Williamsport, Pennsylvania
Wilkes-Barre, Pennsylvania
Government of Dauphin County, Pennsylvania
Government of Luzerne County, Pennsylvania
Government of Lackawanna County, Pennsylvania
Government of Lycoming County, Pennsylvania
Courthouses in Pennsylvania
Courts and tribunals established in 1901